Bolinder may refer to:

Bolinder-Munktell, Swedish manufacturer of a tractor and related machinery
Bolinder Bluff, a landform of the South Shetland Islands

People with the surname
Anton Bolinder (1915–2006), Swedish high jumper